Michel Vergoz (born 10 January 1950) is a member of the Senate of France.  He was first elected in 2011, and represents the Réunion department.  A pharmacist by profession, he serves as a member of the Socialist Party. He was the mayor of Sainte-Rose, Réunion from 1989 to 2001.

References

Page on the French Senate website

1950 births
Living people
People from Saint-Denis, Réunion
French Senators of the Fifth Republic
Mayors of places in Réunion
La République En Marche! politicians
Senators of Réunion